The Fusiliers Museum of Northumberland, formerly the Northumberland Fusiliers Museum, is a museum located within the Abbot's Tower of Alnwick Castle in Alnwick, Northumberland, England.

History
The museum was first established at Fenham Barracks in Newcastle upon Tyne in 1929 but moved to Alnwick Castle in 1970.

Collection
The museum displays the history of the Royal Northumberland Fusiliers and its predecessor regiments from 1674 to current times. It is an independent registered charity. It also displays artifacts such as the nameplate from the steam locomotive "Private E Sykes VC" which commemorated the soldier who had been awarded the Victoria Cross while serving with the regiment.

The Royal Regiment of Fusiliers was created in 1968 after the amalgamation of four Regiments. Thus the museum is part of a family of other Fusilier museums: the Royal Regiment of Fusiliers Museum (Royal Warwickshire) in Warwick, the Fusilier Museum (Lancashire) in Bury and the Fusiliers Museum (London) at the Tower of London.

Victoria Crosses held by the museum
The museum holds the Victoria Crosses awarded to the following members of the regiment:
Sergeant Robert Grant 5th Regiment of Foot (Indian Rebellion)
Second Lieutenant James Johnson 2nd Battalion, Northumberland Fusiliers (First World War)
Private Patrick McHale 5th Regiment of Foot (Indian Rebellion)
Sergeant Peter McManus 5th Regiment of Foot (Indian Rebellion)
Private Ernest Sykes 27th Battalion, Northumberland Fusiliers (First World War)

See also
 Royal Northumberland Fusiliers

References

External links 
 Fusiliers Museum of Northumberland
 Alnwick Castle

Alnwick
Regimental museums in England
Museums in Northumberland
Military history of Northumberland
Royal Northumberland Fusiliers
Charities based in England